SM U-126 was one of the 329 submarines serving in the Imperial German Navy in World War I.
U-126 was engaged in the naval warfare and took part in the First Battle of the Atlantic.

Design
German Type UE II submarines were preceded by the shorter Type UE I submarines. The submarine was powered by two  engines for use while surfaced, and two  engines for use while submerged. She had two shafts and two  propellers.

U-126 was fitted with four  torpedo tubes (fitted at its bow), twelve torpedoes, two  mine chutes (fitted at its stern), forty-two mines, one  SK L/45 deck gun, and 494 rounds. She had a complement of forty (thirty-six crew members and four officers).

References

Notes

Citations

Bibliography

World War I submarines of Germany
1918 ships
Ships built in Hamburg
U-boats commissioned in 1918